Buffini is a surname. Notable people with the surname include: 

Damon Buffini (born 1962), British businessman
Moira Buffini (born 1965), British dramatist, director, and actor